Seydlitz was a heavy cruiser of Nazi Germany's Kriegsmarine, fourth in the , but was never completed. The ship was laid down in December 1936 and launched in January 1939, but the outbreak of World War II slowed her construction and fitting-out work was finally stopped in the summer of 1940 when she was approximately 95 percent complete. The unfinished ship remained pier-side in the shipyard until March 1942, when the Kriegsmarine decided to pursue aircraft carriers over surface combatants. Seydlitz was among the vessels chosen for conversion into auxiliary aircraft carriers.

Renamed Weser, the ship was to have had a complement of ten Bf 109 fighters and ten Ju 87 divebombers. Work was not completed, however, and the incomplete vessel was towed to Königsberg where she was eventually scuttled. The ship was seized by the advancing Soviet Army and was briefly considered for cannibalization for spare parts to complete her sistership  for the Soviet Navy. This plan was also abandoned, and the ship was broken up for scrap.

Design 

The  of heavy cruisers was ordered in the context of German naval rearmament after the Nazi Party came to power in 1933 and repudiated the disarmament clauses of the Treaty of Versailles. In 1935, Germany signed the Anglo–German Naval Agreement with Great Britain, which provided a legal basis for German naval rearmament; the treaty specified that Germany would be able to build five  "treaty cruisers". The Admiral Hippers were nominally within the 10,000-ton limit, though they significantly exceeded the figure.

Seydlitz was powered by three sets of geared steam turbines, which were supplied with steam by twelve ultra-high pressure oil-fired boilers. As designed, her standard complement consisted of 42 officers and 1,340 enlisted men.

Seydlitzs primary armament was eight  SK L/60 guns mounted in four twin gun turrets, placed in superfiring pairs forward and aft. Her anti-aircraft battery  consisted of twelve  L/65 guns, twelve  guns, and eight  guns. The ship also carried a pair of triple  torpedo launchers abreast of the rear superstructure. The ship was equipped with three Arado Ar 196 seaplanes and one catapult.

Construction and conversion 

Seydlitz was ordered by the Kriegsmarine from the Deschimag shipyard in Bremen. Seydlitz was originally designed as a light cruiser version of the Admiral Hipper-class heavy cruisers, armed with twelve  guns instead of the Admiral Hippers eight  guns. The Kriegsmarine decided, however, to complete the ship identically to Admiral Hipper on 14 November 1936. Her keel was laid on 29 December 1936, under construction number 940. The ship was launched on 19 January 1939, but after the outbreak of World War II in September 1939, work was halted when the ship was approximately 95 percent complete.

Following the loss of the battleship  in May 1941, during which British aircraft carriers proved instrumental, and the near torpedoing of her sistership  in March 1942, the Kriegsmarine became convinced of the necessity of acquiring aircraft carriers. Work on the purpose-built carrier , which had been halted in April 1940, was resumed in March 1942. The Kriegsmarine also decided to convert a number of vessels into auxiliary aircraft carriers. Seydlitz was among the ships selected for conversion, along with several passenger liners.

At the same time as construction of Graf Zeppelin resumed, conversion work began on Seydlitz. The majority of the superstructure was cut away, with the exception of the funnel, to prepare for the installation of a flight deck and an aircraft hangar. Her armament was reduced to an anti-aircraft battery of ten 10.5 cm L/65 guns in twin mounts, two forward of the conning tower and three aft, ten 3.7 cm guns in dual mounts, and twenty-four 2 cm guns in quadruple mounts.

Seydlitzs air complement was to have consisted of ten Bf 109 fighters and ten Ju 87 Stuka divebombers. The Bf 109 fighters were a navalized version of the "E" model, designated as Bf 109T. Their wings were longer than the land-based model to allow for shorter take-off. The Ju 87 type selected was to have been the "E" variant, which was a navalized version of the Ju 87D, and were modified for catapult launches and were equipped with arresting gear.

Work was ceased in June 1943, before the conversion was completed. The unfinished vessel was then transferred to Königsberg, where she remained for the rest of the war. On 29 January 1945, the ship was scuttled before the advancing Soviet Red Army could seize her. The Soviet Navy nevertheless considered using the wreck for parts to complete the cruiser , a sister-ship of Seydlitz the Soviets had purchased unfinished before the outbreak of war. This was not carried out, however, and the ship was broken up for scrap.

Footnotes

Notes

Citations

References

Further reading

External links
 Illustrations of Seydlitz as a cruiser and the proposed carrier conversion

Admiral Hipper-class cruisers
Ships built in Bremen (state)
1939 ships
World War II cruisers of Germany
World War II aircraft carriers of Germany
World War II shipwrecks in the Baltic Sea
Germany–Soviet Union relations
Maritime incidents in April 1945
Proposed ships of Germany